John Whitaker MBE (born 5 August 1955, Huddersfield) is a British equestrian and Olympian who competes in show jumping. He has won numerous international medals including an olympic silver medal at the 1984 Summer Olympics held in Los Angeles.

He is also the managing director of John Whitaker International Limited which produces tack and equestrian clothing.

Showjumping 

John and his brother Michael have both been competing for decades at the highest international level.

Whitaker has enjoyed success across four decades. He has competed at World and European Championships and five olympic teams between 1984 and 2016.

He has won the Hickstead Derby four times.

Horses 
He is best known for his partnership with the horse Milton with whom he won the Du Maunier Grand Prix at Spruce Meadows and won over £1 million in prize money before being retired in 1994.

However he won his olympic medal in 1984 on Ryan's Son who he was given at the age of 18 and had a partnership with for 14 years.

Personal life 
The Whitaker family is well known for its showjumping prowess. John is married to Clare Barr and has three children – Joanne, Louise and Robert. Robert Whitaker has successfully show jumped at the highest levels. John's niece Ellen Whitaker, nephew William Whitaker and younger brother Michael Whitaker are also show jumpers.

John began riding at the age of 6, taught by his mother, who ran a riding school. As children, John and his brother Michael delivered milk using a horse and cart until they were 16 and began to show jump professionally.

References

External links 

 John Whitaker's official fan club website
 FEI Rider's Biography

1955 births
Living people
Members of the Order of the British Empire
British male equestrians
Olympic equestrians of Great Britain
Olympic silver medallists for Great Britain
Equestrians at the 1984 Summer Olympics
Equestrians at the 1992 Summer Olympics
Equestrians at the 1996 Summer Olympics
Equestrians at the 2000 Summer Olympics
Equestrians at the 2008 Summer Olympics
Equestrians at the 2016 Summer Olympics
British show jumping riders
Sportspeople from Huddersfield
Olympic medalists in equestrian
Medalists at the 1984 Summer Olympics